Sergey Fyodorovich Letov (born September 24, 1956), is a Russian musician and composer, known for his improvisational style. He is the founder of the recording label Pentagram. He has collaborated with numerous jazz, avant-garde, modern classical, rock and electronic music artists, including his younger brother Yegor Letov, composer Sergey Kuryokhin, and cult Soviet art punk band DK. Letov has written music for movies and plays, collaborating with Russian, Italian and Austrian theatres, the German non-profit cultural association Goethe-Institut, and the Moscow Institute of Journalism and Literature.

Discography
The following is a partial list of albums featuring Sergey Letov

 TRI-O. Trialogue. SoLyd Records, 1995
 Document. New Music from Russia. The 80-s. Leo Records
 Conspiracy. Zurich 1989. Leo Records
Sergey Kuryokhin Polynesia. SoLyd Records
Sergey Kuryokhin and Pop-Mechanika. Live in France. Kurizza records
 Kings and cabbages. Moscow Composers Orchestra. Leo Records
 Moscow Composers Orchestra and Sainkho. Life at City Garden. U-Sound
 Soft Animals. Conquest of the Arctic. Random
 Dice 2. She Says. Ishtar Records
Sergey Kuryokhin. Tragedy, Rock Style. Union Records
Sergey Kuryokhin. Divine Madness. Leo Records
DK. A cup of tea. SS Records
 The soldier Semenov. Step back! ZVUKOREKI
Sainkho. Out of Tuva. Craw 6
DDT. Time. DDT Records
 Inna Kuznetsova. A lonely island + 4 Remakes DJ OBJie. Objective Music
 Suchilin, Letov, Pillaev. Palma mira (A Palm of Peace). Objective Music
Umka & Bronevichok. Komandovat' paradom. Otdeleniye vyhod
DK. A mine field by the 8 of March. SS Records
DK. Moskva kolbasnaya. SS Records
 AU (Pig) Holiday of Disobedience or The Last Day of Pompei 1998
Valentina Ponomareva. FORTE. Boheme Music
 Yury Yaremchuk. Duets. Landy Star
 Misha Feigin with Serguei Letov. Moscow in June. Spontaneous Folks Records
DK. DMB-85. SS Records
DK. An Occupation. SS Records
DK. Tantsy-Shmantsy Brahmsa SS Records
DK. Boga Nyet SS Records
DK. Do osnovania a zatem. SS Records
DK. Snova liubov' poselitsa. SS Records
 Nick Rock-n-Roll and group Trite Dushu. Padre. Branch "exit".
Sergey Kuryokhin. Italy. Solyd Records
Sergey Kuryokhin. Iblivyi opossum. Solyd Records
Sergey Kuryokhin. Don Carlos. Solyd Records
Sergey Kuryokhin. Prizrak Kommunisma. Solyd Records
DK. FAMILY of the FLOWER KINGS. SS Records
 TRI-O and one D.A.Prigov. HOR Records
 Sergey Letov, Alexei Borisov, Anton Nikkilä. HOR Records
Grazhdanskaya Oborona. Zvezdopad. HOR Records
Grazhdanskaya Oborona. Tribute. Misteria zvuka
Grazhdanskaya Oborona. Svoboda (Freedom). HOR Records
Yegor Letov, Sergei Letov. Concert in O.G.I.. HOR Records
Golden Years of Soviet New Jazz. Volume III. Leo records
 Sergei Letov - Yury Parfenov. Secret Doctrine. HOR Records
 Vladimir Miller and Quartets. Long Arms
 Andrei Suchilin. Quasiland
 Virtual Flowers. Dark Cocktail. Random Music. 
 Sokolovsky Ivan, Letov Serguei. Simulated Prison. Random Music
 THE NEW BLOCKADERS/GOSPLAN TRIO. Sound Sketch for Raging Flames 
 Rada & Ternovnik. Zagovory. Vyrgorod
Sainkho Namtchylak. Arzhaana. Asia+
Sergey Kuryokhin. Pop-Mechanics. WESTBAM
 TRI-O & Sainkho. Forgotten streets of St. Petersburg. Leo Records
 HLAM. Woodstockeveryday. HLAM Records
 Zoo Jazz. Hivernale Pudeur. Sergey Letov. Pascal Rousseau. Ivan Sokolovsky. Exotica EXO 03137
 Alex Rostotsky/Yury Parfenov. Once Upon a Time in the City of Kazan Cosmic Sounds CS-17
EMBRYO 2000 live vol. 1 Indigo 9753-2
 Sergey Letov, Alexei Borisov, D. A. Prigov. Concert in O.G.I. Otdelenie VYHOD V 168
 RADA and GOSPLAN trio OTDELENIE VYHOD CD B242
 KILLDOZER. Vadim Kurilev and Sergey Letov.
Elektricheskiye Partizany (Electric Guerillas). Chyorny Protuberanets ili Nam Nuzhna Anarkhiya
 Symphony of Horror. Cisfinitum and Sergey Letov.
 Oxford News. Lidya Kavina, Sergey Letov, Vladimir Kitliar, Misha Salnikov and Alexei Borisov.

References

1956 births
Living people
Russian musicians
Soviet people